Sumitra Patir is an Indian politician who is the member of Assam Legislative Assembly from Dhemaji Assembly constituency (no. 113)  in Dhemaji district, as of 2013. She was Minister of State with Independent Charge in Tarun Gogoi government.

References

Living people
People from Dhemaji district
Women members of the Assam Legislative Assembly
Year of birth missing (living people)
Indian National Congress politicians from Assam
Assam MLAs 2016–2021
21st-century Indian women politicians
21st-century Indian politicians
Assam MLAs 2006–2011
State cabinet ministers of Assam
Women state cabinet ministers of India